Cecidomyiini is a tribe of gall midges in the family Cecidomyiidae. There are at least 220 described species in Cecidomyiini.

See also
 List of Cecidomyiini genera

References

 Gagné, R. J. (1989). The Plant-Feeding Gall Midges of North America, 356.

Further reading

 Diptera.info
 NCBI Taxonomy Browser, Cecidomyiini
 

Cecidomyiinae
Nematocera tribes